Kawara may refer to:

Places
Kawara, Fukuoka

People
On Kawara, Japanese artist
Riki Kawara, Japanese politician

See also
 Kawara Museum
 Kawara Station